A starting pistol or starter pistol is a blank handgun or, more recently. an electronic toy gun or device with a button connected to a sound system that is fired to start track and field races as well as some competitive swimming races. Traditional starter guns cannot fire real ammunition without first being extensively modified: Blank shells or caps are used to prevent expelling projectiles, and only a small amount of smoke can be seen when shot. In most places, trying to modify the replica is illegal.

Starting pistols may also include modified versions of standard pistols incapable of firing bullets, most commonly achieved by welding an obstruction into the barrel. This is less common nowadays, especially in Western countries. When electronic timing is used, a sensor is often affixed to the gun, which sends an electronic signal to the timing system upon firing. For deaf competitors or for modern electronic systems, the electronic toy gun sends off a light signal, with some events using a light system.

Use in races 
The sound of the gun going off serves as the signal for the athletes to begin the event.
An issue with the use of starting pistols is that, since the report of the pistol is carried to the competitors at the speed of sound, which takes about 3 milliseconds to travel one metre, positions nearest the starter hear the report a few milliseconds before further positions. This issue is exaggerated in races where the runners begin in a stagger, putting a significant distance between the nearest and furthest runners. To avoid this problem, the pistol is in all major competitions wired with a microphone that transmits the sound virtually instantaneously to loudspeakers directly behind each competitor.

With security after the September 11 attacks on the US becoming prevalent and causing issues with starting pistols, a trend developed to use electronic starting systems that do not use pistols but use a "dummy" prop pistol or a signaling device similar to those used on game shows which cannot function as a firearm and that is wired to the timing system. When the starter presses the button, they emit a signal to play a simulated gunshot that is broadcast to loudspeakers behind each lane, show a flash from the gun, and start the timing clock. Many venues have switched to the new format. Beyond the security concerns, it has also been observed that even with the use of loudspeakers and with hearing impaired competitors, a light system connected to the electronic pistol, some competitors still wait for the actual sound of the gun to reach them, and since the new all-electronic starting pistols have no such problems, they became the official way of starting games at the 2012 Summer Olympics.

Use in American and Canadian football
Officials in American and Canadian football formerly used a starting pistol to end each quarter of a game.  In the NFL this was first done in 1924, to avoid confusion with the whistles and air horns used for other signals; at the time the stadium clock did not show the official game time, which was kept by the officials on the field. The stadium clock later became the official game time and the NFL discontinued the gunshot in 1994.  Furthermore, upon the official end of the period, the referee will announce "That is the end of the (x period)" to the public address system.

Use in the arts
Beside sporting events, starter pistols are also used in films and in TV or stage shows.

Criminal use
Some pistols made to fire only blanks can be converted to fire live ammunition. Such makeshift firearms are used in crime and many are illegal to possess in certain jurisdictions.

See also
Incidents involving starting pistols
Adam Ant 2002 pub incident in Camden
Algiers Motel incident
LOT Flight 165 hijacking
Lufthansa Flight 592
David Kang
Discovery, Inc. 2010 Hostage Crisis

References

Firearms
Sport of athletics equipment
Speed skating equipment
Cycling equipment